Don't You may refer to:
 "Don't You" (song), a 1989 by The Forester Sisters
 Don't You (album), a 2016 album by Wet
 "Don't You", a 1995 song by Robyn Hitchcock from You & Oblivion
 "Don't You", a 2021 song by Taylor Swift from Fearless (Taylor's Version)

See also
 "Don't You (Forget About Me)", a 1985 song by Simple Minds